Modern Girls or Today's Girls (Hungarian: Mai lányok) is a 1937 Hungarian comedy film directed by Béla Gaál and starring Lia Szepes, Jëno Pataky and Steven Geray. The film may be best remembered for Magda Gabor's appearance in a supporting role.

Cast
 Lia Szepes as Hanzéli Zsuzsi  
 Jenõ Pataky as Németh Péter  
 Steven Geray as Székely Feri (credited as Gyergyai István)
 Lili Berky as Péter   
 Magda Kun as Cili 
 Margit Dajka as Kati (credited as Dayka Margit)
 Magda Gabor as Lenke (credited as Gábor Magda)
 Ági Donáth as Mária 
 Eva Biro as Viola (credited as Bíró Éva)
 Gyula Justh as asztalos  
 József Juhász as asztalossegéd  
 László Dezsõffy as magándetektív  
 Gusztáv Vándory as anyakönyvvezetõ  
 István Dózsa as árverezõ  
 Lajos Köpeczi Boócz as ügyvéd  
 Tibor Puskás as inas

References

Bibliography

 Nemeskürty, István & Szántó, Tibor. A Pictorial Guide to the Hungarian Cinema, 1901-1984. Helikon, 1985. 
 Phillips, Alastair & Vincendeau, Ginette. Journeys of Desire: European Actors in Hollywood. British Film Institute, 2006.

External links

1937 films
Hungarian comedy films
1937 comedy films
1930s Hungarian-language films
Films based on Hungarian novels
Films scored by Paul Abraham
Hungarian black-and-white films